The 2007 Bolsover District Council election took place on 3 May 2007 to elect members of Bolsover District Council in Derbyshire, England. The whole council was up for election and the Labour party stayed in overall control of the council.

Election result
Labour remained in control of the council but lost 4 seats to hold 27 of the 37 councillors. Respect won their first seat on the council after Ray Holmes took Shirebrook North West by 31 votes, defeating the Labour whip on the council, Stephen Fritchley.

Independents also made gains, with 7 independent councillors elected in Blackwell, Clowne North, Clowne South, Elmton-with-Creswell, Shirebrook South West and Tibshelf wards, up from 4 before the election. Meanwhile, the Whitwell Residents Association held both seats in Whitwell, with their second candidate 39 votes ahead of an independent candidate.

Ward results

References

2007
2007 English local elections
2000s in Derbyshire